Sabotage at Sea is a 1942 British, black-and-white, drama, mystery, war film, directed by Leslie S. Hiscott and starring Jane Carr, Margaretta Scott, David Hutcheson and Ronald Shiner as Ernie the Cook. It was produced by British National Films and Shaftesbury Films.

It has the overall format of a whodunnit but with a clear theme of protecting military secrets during the Second World War.

Synopsis
A series of vignettes introduce us to a selection of people who late turn out to be the individual suspects.

Cargo ship Captain Tracey (David Hutcheson) has discovered that enemy agents have tampered with his ship. The film follows the search for the saboteur. The unlikely scenario means that six would-be subjects are jointly kidnapped/shanghaied and kept on board while he investigates which one is the saboteur.

The suspects include both males and females including members of the shipping company (Digby & Farar) and their relatives.

The investigation tales place en route to New York.

Cast
Jane Carr as Diane  	
Margaretta Scott as Jane Dighton 	
	David Hutcheson as Captain Tracey 
Martita Hunt as Daphne Faber 
Felix Aylmer as John Dighton 
Ralph Truman as Chandler 
	Ian Fleming as 1st Officer 
Arthur Maude as Engineer Officer 
	William Hartnell as Digby 
	Wally Patch as Steward
Ronald Shiner as Cook 
 Hay Petrie as Talkative Sailor at Table

Critical reception
TV Guide wrote, "the cast is handicapped by an uneventful, wordy script."

References

External links
 
 
 

1942 films
1942 drama films
1940s mystery drama films
1940s war drama films
British black-and-white films
1940s English-language films
Films directed by Leslie S. Hiscott
British World War II propaganda films
British mystery drama films
British war drama films